Fabio Ceresa (born 21 August 1981) is an Italian opera director and librettist.

Opera productions 
 L'Orfeo, immagini di una lontananza, by Luigi Rossi / Daniela Terranova 2012, Festival della Valle d'Itria
 Giovanna d'Arco, by Giuseppe Verdi, 2013, Festival della Valle d'Itria
 Madama Butterfly, by Giacomo Puccini, 2014 Teatro Comunale Florence
 Tosca, by Giacomo Puccini, 2014, Teatro Coccia, Novara
 Guglielmo Ratcliff, by Pietro Mascagni, 2015, Wexford Festival Opera
 Madama Butterfly, by Giacomo Puccini, 2015, 
 I puritani, by Vincenzo Bellini, 2015, Teatro Regio di Torino
 Madama Butterfly, by Giacomo Puccini, 2015, Teatro Petruzzelli di Bari
 I puritani, by Vincenzo Bellini, 2015, Opera di Firenze
 Maria de Rudenz, by Gaetano Donizetti, 2016, Wexford Festival Opera
 Rigoletto, by Giuseppe Verdi, 2016, Opernhaus Kiel
 Orlando finto pazzo, by Antonio Vivaldi, 2016, Korea National Opera
 Madama Butterfly, by Giacomo Puccini, 2022,

Librettos 
 Re tuono (King Thunder), by Daniela Terranova, 2010 (Suvini Zerboni)
 Mannaggia a Bubbà! (Damn Bubbà!) by Daniela Terranova, 2011 (Suvini Zerboni)
 L'Orfeo, immagini di una lontananza (Orfeo, Images of a Remoteness), by Luigi Rossi / Daniela Terranova, 2012, Festival della Valle d'Itria (Suvini Zerboni)
 Le falene (The Moths), by Daniela Terranova, 2013, Festival della Valle d'Itria (Suvini Zerboni)
 Il vascello incantato (The Magic Vessel), by Marco Taralli, 2007, Teatro Carlo Felice di Genova; 2013, Teatro Comunale di Bologna (Sonzogno)
 Marco Polo, by Daniele Zanettovich, 2013, Croatian National Theatre, Rijeka (Edizioni Musicali Pizzicato)
 La ciociara (Two Women), by Marco Tutino, 2015, San Francisco Opera (Sonzogno)

Awards 
 International Opera Award 2016: Best Young Director

References

External links 
 
 Fabio Ceresa, Operabase

1981 births
Musicians from the Province of Cremona
Living people
Italian opera directors
Italian opera librettists